Nutcracker: Money, Madness and Murder is a 1987 miniseries directed by Paul Bogart based on the book Nutcracker: Money, Madness, Murder: A Family Album by Shana Alexander that tells the story of Frances Schreuder.

Synopsis
New York City resident and wannabe socialite Frances Berenice Schreuder (née Bradshaw) plots the murder of her multi-millionaire father Franklin Bradshaw. She has stolen money from him in the past and has also alienated her sisters; however, her mother is blind to her narcissism and staunchly defends her. Schreuder wants her daughter to become a famous ballerina. Totally without scruples, she tries to manipulate the men in her life, including her two sons, into doing her bidding.

Cast
 Lee Remick as Frances Schreuder
 Tate Donovan as Marc
 John Glover as Richard Behrens
 Linda Kelsey as Elaine
 Frank Military as Larry
 G.D. Spradlin as Franklin Bradshaw
 Inga Swenson as Marilyn
 Elizabeth Wilson as Berenice Bradshaw
 David Ackroyd as Jones
 Lee de Broux as Van Dam
 Jonathan Frakes as Rosen
 Tony Musante as Vittorio
 Ben Hartigan as Minister

Reception
Critics from The Los Angeles Times and The New York Times both noted that this was the second of two miniseries adaptations of the Frances Schreuder story, the earlier adaptation being At Mother's Request.

Accolades
Lee Remick was nominated for a Primetime Emmy Award for Outstanding Lead Actress in a Limited Series or Movie and John Glover was nominated for a Primetime Emmy Award for Outstanding Supporting Actor in a Limited Series or Movie at the 39th Primetime Emmy Awards.

References

External links
 

1987 television films
1987 films
1980s American television miniseries
Films directed by Paul Bogart
Films scored by Billy Goldenberg
Biographical films about criminals
1987 drama films
1987 thriller films
Films about murderers
Films about murder